Chhedilal (also written Chhedi Lal) was the third Lieutenant Governor of Puducherry Union Territory in India. He succeeded Basappa Danappa Jatti in the Third Assembly and was Lieutenant Governor in Fourth Assembly.

Titles held

References

See also
Governors and Lieutenant-Governors of states of India
List of Governors of India

People from Karachi
Lieutenant Governors of Puducherry
Living people
Year of birth missing (living people)